Ratnagiri Assembly constituency is one of the 288 Vidhan Sabha (Assembly) constituencies of Maharashtra state in Western India. It is one of the 6 assembly seats under Ratnagiri-Sindhudurg (Lok Sabha constituency).

Members of Legislative Assembly
 
^ by-poll

Election results

General Election 1972
 S. E Hassnain (INC) : 22,325 votes   
 Niwendkar V Krishnaji (BJS) : 13,395

General Election 1978
 Abhyankar, Kusumtai Ramchandra (JNP) : 29,901 votes  
 Paje Shantaram Laxman (INC) : 19,876 votes

General Election 1980
 Kusum Abhyankar (BJP) : 16,996  
 Jadyar, Shivajirao Tulaji (INC(I)) : 16,483

1983 bypoll
      Bypoll held due to sitting MLA's death
 Gotad, Shivaji Ramchandra (BJP) : 23,777 votes 
 S.G.Sitaram (INC) : 21,340

General Election 1985
 Shivajirao Jadyar (INC) : 30,518 votes 
 Gotad Sivaji Ramchandra (BJP) : 19,252

General Election 1990
 Sivaji Ramchandra Gotad (BJP) : 39,823
 Shivajirao Jadyar (INC) : 31729 votes

General Election 2009

General Election 2014

2019 Result

References

Assembly constituencies of Maharashtra
Ratnagiri